Saliha Sultan ("the devotous one"; 21 March 1715 – 11 October 1778) was an Ottoman princess, the daughter of Sultan Ahmed III, and his consort Hatem Kadın. She had a twin brother who died in infancy, Şehzade Selim. She was the half-sister of Sultans Mustafa III and Abdul Hamid I.

Life

Birth
Saliha Sultan was born on 21 March 1715 in the Edirne Palace. Her father was Sultan Ahmed III, and her mother was one of his consorts, Hatem Kadın. She had a twin brother named Şehzade Selim, who died in infancy, on February 1718.

Marriages
On 25 May 1728, at the age of thirteen, her father betrothed her Sari Mustafa Pasha, son of Gazi Deli Husein Pasha. The marriage took place three days later on 28 May. Her dowry was 10,000 ducats. On the same day she and her trousseau were taken to her palace located in Eyüp. The two together had one at least a son and a daughter. She was widowed at his death in 1731.

On 30 June 1740, during the reign of her cousin Sultan Mahmud I, she married Sarhoş Ali Pasha, son of Abdi Pasha. She was widowed at his death in 1744. After Ali Pasha's death, she married Hatibzade Yahya Pasha. She was widowed at his death in 1755.

Three years later, on 6 April 1758, during the reign of her brother Sultan Mustafa III, she married Grand Vizier Koca Ragıp Pasha, when she was forty three, and Ragıp Pasha was sixty one years old. She was widowed at his death in 1763. On 9 May 1764, she married Vezir Turşu Mehmed Pasha, who had formerly served as the agha of the janissaries, and kapudan pasha. She was widowed at his death in 1770.

Death
Saliha Sultan died on 11 October 1778 in Bahariye Palace in Eyüp at the age of sixty-three, and was buried in Eyüp cemetery, Istanbul. After her death, her goods were captured by the treasury. Her houses and plots were assigned to Esma Sultan.

Issue
Saliha Sultan had a son and four daughters. 

By her first marriage, Saliha Sultan had at least a sons and a daughter:
Sultanzade Ahmed Bey (1729 - 1736);
Fatma Hanımsultan, married in 1748 to Ibrahim Bey, brother of Hatibzade Yahya Pasha;

Saliha Sultan had also other three daughters, but it is not known from which marriages they were born:
 Ayşe Hanımsultan (died in 1754, buried in Eyüp cemetery);.
Emine Hanımsultan (died 12 May 1783, buried in Eyüp cemetery).
Hatice Hanımsultan, married Mehmed Bey, son of Fatma Hanımsultan, daughter of Fatma Sultan.

Ancestry

References

Sources
 
 
 
 

1715 births
1778 deaths
18th-century Ottoman princesses